Lloyd Williams is a Jamaican reggae singer of the 1960s. From 1966 to 1970, Williams featured with The Tommy McCook Band, as well as a multitude of ad hoc ensembles: Soul Gang, The Highlights, and The Celestials.

Selected discography
"Back Out With It"
"Little School Girl" 
"Burning Up"
"Is It Because I'm Black" 1970

References

Living people
Year of birth missing (living people)